is a former Japanese football player. She played for the Japan women's national football team as a goalkeeper.

Club career
Yamago was born in Saitama on January 16, 1975. After graduating from high school, she joined Prima Ham FC Kunoichi (later Iga FC Kunoichi) in 1993. In 2002, she moved to her local club Saitama Reinas FC (later Urawa Reds). In 2005, she moved to Women's Premier Soccer League club California Storm. At the end of the 2005 season, she returned to Urawa Reds in September. In 2012, she moved to AS Elfen Saitama. She retired in 2014. She was selected to the Nadeshiko League Best XI 10 times (1996, 1999, 2001, 2002, 2003, 2004, 2007, 2008, 2009 and 2010).

National team career
On June 15, 1997, Yamago debuted for the Japan national team against China. She was a member of Japan squads at the 1999, 2003, 2007 and 2011 Women's World Cups, as well as the 2004 Summer Olympics. At the 2011 World Cup, Japan won the championship. She played 96 games for Japan until 2011.

National team statistics

Honors
 FIFA Women's World Cup
 Champion (1): 2011
 Football at the Asian Games
 Gold Medal (1): 2010

References

External links

1975 births
Living people
Association football people from Saitama Prefecture
Japanese women's footballers
Japan women's international footballers
Nadeshiko League players
Iga FC Kunoichi players
Urawa Red Diamonds Ladies players
Chifure AS Elfen Saitama players
FIFA Women's World Cup-winning players
1999 FIFA Women's World Cup players
2003 FIFA Women's World Cup players
2007 FIFA Women's World Cup players
2011 FIFA Women's World Cup players
Olympic footballers of Japan
Footballers at the 2004 Summer Olympics
Asian Games medalists in football
Asian Games gold medalists for Japan
Asian Games silver medalists for Japan
Asian Games bronze medalists for Japan
Footballers at the 1998 Asian Games
Footballers at the 2002 Asian Games
Footballers at the 2006 Asian Games
Footballers at the 2010 Asian Games
Medalists at the 1998 Asian Games
Medalists at the 2002 Asian Games
Medalists at the 2006 Asian Games
Medalists at the 2010 Asian Games
Women's association football goalkeepers
California Storm players
Women's Premier Soccer League players
Japanese expatriate sportspeople in the United States
Expatriate women's soccer players in the United States